Riz Ab or Rizab may refer to:
 Rizab, Nishapur, Razavi Khorasan Province
 Riz Ab, South Khorasan
 Rizab Rural District, in Fars Province